"When Will I See Your Face Again" is the first single from the Jamie Scott and the Town album Park Bench Theories. The lyrics reflect on lost love: the singer fears losing contact with the one he loves; despite the fact that she promises to come back to him, she didn't, and he is wondering "When Will I See Your Face Again".

Chart positions

References 

2007 singles
2007 songs
Song articles with missing songwriters